Design Museum is a museum in Helsinki devoted to the exhibition of both Finnish and foreign design, including industrial design, fashion, and graphic design. The building is situated in Kaartinkaupunki, on Korkeavuorenkatu Street, and is owned by the Republic of Finland through Senate Properties. The building was completed in 1895 and originally built as a school building for the Swedish school Läroverket för gossar och flickor.

The museum, which is 140 years old (2013) and one of the oldest in the world – was first founded in 1873 but has operated in its present premises, a former school, designed by architect Gustaf Nyström in 1894 in the neo-Gothic style, since 1978. In 2002, the museum changed its name from Taideteollisuusmuseo to Designmuseo ("Design Museum") because the original name was too long and complicated. The museum also has a cafe and shop. Situated on the same city block is the Museum of Finnish Architecture.

The museum includes a permanent exhibition devoted to the history of Finnish design from 1870 to the present day, as well as space for changing exhibitions. The museum's permanent collection consists of over 75,000 objects, 40,000 drawings and 100,000 drawings. Design Museum arranges also international touring exhibitions and publishes books and exhibition catalogues. From museum's home page, there is a free access to several web exhibitions on Finnish design, for example about the production of Arabia Factory, Marimekko and designers Kaj Franck and Oiva Toikka. Latest web exhibition is about 1950–60s design – an iconic golden era of Finnish Design.

References

External links

 

Design museums
Museums in Helsinki
Art museums and galleries in Finland
Art museums established in 1873
1873 establishments in Finland
Kaartinkaupunki